The Mysteries of Udolpho, by Ann Radcliffe, appeared in four volumes on 8 May 1794 from G. G. and J. Robinson of London. Her fourth and most popular novel, The Mysteries of Udolpho tells of Emily St. Aubert, who suffers misadventures that include the death of her mother and father, supernatural terrors in a gloomy castle, and machinations of an Italian brigand. Often cited as the archetypal Gothic novel, The Mysteries of Udolpho appears prominently in Jane Austen's 1817 novel Northanger Abbey, where an impressionable young woman reader comes to see friends and acquaintances as Gothic villains and victims, with amusing results.

Plot
The Mysteries of Udolpho is a quintessential Gothic romance, replete with incidents of physical and psychological terror: remote crumbling castles, seemingly supernatural events, a brooding, scheming villain and a persecuted heroine.

Modern editors note that only about a third of the novel is set in the eponymous Gothic castle, while tone and style vary markedly between sections of the work, to which Radcliffe added extended descriptions of exotic landscapes in the Pyrenees and Apennines, and of Venice, none of which she had visited. For details she relied on travel books, which led her to make several anachronisms. The novel, set in 1584 in Southern France and Northern Italy, explores the plight of Emily St. Aubert, a young French woman orphaned by the death of her father. She is imprisoned in Castle Udolpho by Signor Montoni, an Italian brigand who has married her aunt and guardian Madame Cheron. He and others frustrate Emily's romance with the dashing Valancourt. Emily also investigates a relationship between her father and the Marchioness de Villeroi, and its connection to Castle Udolpho.

Emily St. Aubert is the only child of a landed rural family whose fortunes are in decline. Emily and her father share a notably close bond in a shared appreciation for nature. They grow still closer after her mother's death from illness. She accompanies him on a journey from their native Gascony, through the Pyrenees to the Mediterranean coast of Roussillon, over many mountainous landscapes. During the journey, they encounter Valancourt, a handsome man who also feels an almost mystical kinship with the natural world. Emily and Valancourt fall in love.

Emily's father succumbs to a long illness. Emily, now orphaned, is forced by his wishes to live with her aunt, Madame Cheron, who shares none of Emily's interests and shows little affection for her. Her aunt marries Montoni, a dubious nobleman from Italy. He wants his friend Count Morano to become Emily's husband and tries to force him upon her. After discovering that Morano is nearly ruined, Montoni brings Emily and her aunt to his remote castle of Udolpho.

Emily fears she has lost Valancourt forever. Morano searches for Emily and tries to carry her off secretly from Udolpho, but Emily's heart still belongs to Valancourt, and she refuses. Morano's attempted escape is discovered by Montoni, who wounds the Count and chases him away. In subsequent months, Montoni threatens his wife with violence, trying to force her to sign over her properties in Toulouse that will otherwise go to Emily on his wife's death. Without resigning her estate, Madame Cheron dies of a severe illness caused by her husband's harshness.

Many frightening but coincidental events happen in the castle, but Emily manages to flee with the help of a secret admirer, Du Pont, also a prisoner there, and of the servants Annette and Ludovico. Returning to her aunt's estate, Emily learns that Valancourt has gone to Paris and lost his wealth. Nonetheless, she takes control of the property and is reunited with Valancourt in the end.

Characters
Emily St. Aubert: Much of the action takes place from her point of view. Emily has a deep appreciation of the sublimity of nature, shared with her father. She is unusually beautiful and gentle with a slight, graceful figure, fond of books, nature, poetry and music. She is described as virtuous, obedient, resourceful, brave, sensitive, and self-reliant. Her childhood home is La Vallée. Her sensitivity leads her to dwell (often in tears) on past misfortunes and imagine with dread troubles that may befall her. She is given to writing verse, selections of which punctuate the novel.
Monsieur St. Aubert: Emily's father, he dies early in the novel while he, Emily and Valancourt are travelling. He warns Emily on his death bed not to become a victim of her feelings, but to acquire command over her emotions. His unaccountable relationship with the Marchioness de Villeroi is one of the novel's mysteries.
Valancourt, younger brother of the Count Duvarney, Valancourt forms an attachment to Emily while travelling with her and her father through the Pyrenees. He is a dashing, enthusiastic young man with a noble character, on furlough from the army when he meets her. St. Aubert sees Valancourt as a desirable match for Emily, although he lacks wealth.
Madame Cheron (later Madame Montoni) is St. Aubert's sister and Emily's aunt. She is a selfish, worldly, vain, wealthy widow living on her estate near Toulouse, when Emily becomes her ward after St. Aubert's death. She is contemptuous and cold, even cruel to Emily at first, thinking solely of herself, but near her death, she softens slightly to Emily, who patiently and selflessly aids and comforts her.
Montoni is a prototypical Gothic villain. Brooding, haughty and scheming, he masquerades as an Italian nobleman to gain Madame Cheron's hand in marriage, then imprisons Emily and Madame Cheron in Udolpho in an attempt to take control of Madame Cheron's wealth and estates. He is cold and often cruel to Emily, who believes him to be a captain of banditti.
Count Morano is introduced to Emily by Montoni, who commands that she marry him. Emily refuses, but Morano still pursues her in Venice and later Udolpho. When Montoni finds that Count Morano is not as rich as he hoped, he abruptly withdraws his support from the suit. Morano tries twice to abduct Emily, but both attempts fail.
Annette, a maid who has accompanied Madame Cheron from France, is talkative and inclined to exaggeration and superstition, but faithful, affectionate and honest. She is in love with Ludovico and often gets locked in closets.
Ludovico, one of Montoni's servants, falls in love with Annette and provides assistance to Emily. He is more sensible than Annette, and is brave and quick-thinking. He is the one who locks the closets.
Cavigni, Verezzi, and Bertolini are cavaliers and friends of Montoni. Cavigini is sly, careful, and flatteringly assiduous. Verezzi is a "man of some talent, of fiery imagination, and the slave of alternate passions. He was gay, voluptuous, and daring; yet had neither perseverance or true courage, and was meanly selfish in all his aims." Bertolini is brave, unsuspecting, merry, dissipated and markedly extravagant. His flightiness to Emily distresses her.
Orsino, an assassin described as the "chief favourite" of Montoni, is cruel, suspicious, merciless and relentlessly vengeful.
Marchioness de Villeroi is a mysterious figure whose miniature Emily finds in a secret panel in her father's closet. She was married to Marquis de Villeroi, but becomes estranged from him and dies through the intervention of Laurentini di Udolpho. She was a sister to M. St. Aubert, and thereby Emily's aunt.
Signora Laurentini di Udolpho (also called Sister Agnes) is a nun in the French monastery of St. Claire. She dies in the final volume of the novel, whereupon she is revealed to be Signora Laurentini, heiress of the house of Udolpho. She has estranged the Marquis de Villeroi, her first love, from his wife, after which she retires to the monastery to live in guilt. She divides her fortune between Emily and the wife of M. Bonnac.
The Marquis de Villeroi was the lover of Laurentini before he married the Marchioness. He leaves the Chateau-le-Blanc after her death.
Francis Beauveau, Count De Villefort is heir to the mansion at Chateau-le-Blanc in Languedoc. He inherits it from his friend the Marquis de Villeroi. He has two children by a previous marriage, Blanche and Henri, and is married to the Countess De Villefort.
Lady Blanche, a sweet young woman with a deep appreciation of the sublime, who writes poetry, resides at Chateau-le-Blanc and befriends Emily, with whom she shares many interests.
Dorothée, a servant at the Chateau-le-Blanc, is superstitious like Annette, but less inclined to be found in a closet.
Monsieur Du Pont is one of Emily's suitors. He steals a miniature of Emily belonging to her mother, which he later returns. He helps Emily and her companions escape from Udolpho. He is a friend of De Villefort, who supports his suit. When Emily steadfastly rejects him, he turns his attentions to Blanche, but is thwarted again when she marries St. Foix.
Monsieur Quesnel, Emily's uncle, is cold and unfeeling towards Emily until she becomes an heiress.
Madame Clairval, Valancourt's aunt and an acquaintance of Madame Cheron, initially approves of the match between Valancourt and Emily, but finally decides there are better prospects for both of them.
Monsieur Bonnac, an officer in the French service about 50 years old, Emily meets at the convent. His wife inherits Castle Udolpho.
Monsieur St. Foix, suitor of Blanche, marries her at the end of the novel.

Publication
The Mysteries of Udolpho was published by the radical bookseller George Robinson's company G. G. and J. Robinson at 25, Paternoster Row, in the City of London. The Robinsons paid her £500 for the manuscript and later also published her A Journey Made in the Summer of 1794.

References in other works

The novel is a focus of attention in Jane Austen's 1817 novel Northanger Abbey, which satirises it.
In Walter Scott's novel Waverley (1814), Scott humorously references Udolpho in the introductory chapter while meditating appropriate subtitles for Waverley.
The Veiled Picture; or, The Mysteries of Gorgono (1802) is a chapbook abridgement of it, preserving most characters and plot elements but dispensing with details and descriptions.
The Castle of Udolpho is mentioned in a letter from Rebecca Sharp to Miss Sedley in William Thackeray's 1848 novel Vanity Fair.
The Castle of Udolpho is mentioned in the defense attorney's speech in Fyodor Dostoevsky's 1880 novel The Brothers Karamazov.
BBC Radio 4 has broadcast two adaptations. The first is a 1996 two-part version by Catherine Czerkawska starring Deborah Berlin as Emily and Robert Glenister. The second is a 2016 one-hour piece by Hattie Naylor with Georgia Groome as Emily.
In 2007, The Mysteries of Udolpho appeared as a graphic novel in the Gothic Classics: Graphic Classics series.
A dramatisation by Carole Diffey was published in July 2015.
In series 1 episode 12 ("Homefront") of Young Justice, the Mysteries of Udolpho was the book used to open a secret passage in the League's library. Several characters in the series are seen reading it.
In Henry James's 1898 novel The Turn of the Screw, the second sentence in Chapter 4 reads: "Was there a 'secret' at Bly – a mystery of Udolpho or an insane, an unmentionable relative kept in unsuspected confinement?"
In Anthony Trollope's Framley Parsonage (1860), a room for interviewing debtors at the London office of solicitors Gumption & Gazebee is likened to the torture chamber at Castle Udolpho.
In Edgar Allan Poe's short story "The Oval Portrait" (1842), "Mrs. Radcliffe" is mentioned in an allusion to The Mysteries of Udolpho.
In Emily of New Moon by Lucy Maud Montgomery, Emily mentions having read The Mysteries of Udolpho when exploring her aunt's strange, "gothic" house.
In Herman Melville's novella Billy Budd, Sailor (1924) the narrator says that an incident "is in its very realism as much charged with that prime element of Radcliffian romance, the mysterious, as any that the ingenuity of the author of the Mysteries of Udolpho could devise."
In Frances Eleanor Trollope's "That Unfortunate Marriage" (1888), "And may one ask where she is? It is not, I presume a Mystery of Udolpho!".

Notes

External links

The Mysteries of Udolpho free downloads in multiple ebook formats

1794 British novels
Fiction set in the 1580s
Novels set in the 16th century
Novels set in Early Modern France
Novels set in Italy
Works set in castles
English novels
Novels by Ann Radcliffe
British Gothic novels
British horror novels
Romanticism
Sentimental novels
British thriller novels
British romance novels
1790s fantasy novels